Jiří Candra (born 16 April 1986 in Prague) is a Czech curler and curling coach.

At the national level, he is a three-time Czech men's champion curler (2016, 2019, 2020) and two-time Czech mixed doubles champion curler (2014, 2015).

He works as curling ice technician (icemaker).

Teams

Men's

Mixed

Mixed doubles

Record as a coach of national teams

Personal life
He started curling in 2002 at the age of 16.

References

External links

Living people
1986 births
Sportspeople from Prague
Czech male curlers
Czech curling champions
Universiade bronze medalists for the Czech Republic
Universiade medalists in curling
Competitors at the 2011 Winter Universiade
Competitors at the 2013 Winter Universiade
Czech curling coaches
Curling ice makers